Michael Robartes and the Dancer is a 1920 book of poems by W. B. Yeats.

It includes the poems:

 Michael Robartes and the Dancer
 Solomon and the Witch
 An Image from a Past Life
 Under Saturn
 Easter, 1916
 Sixteen Dead Men
 The Rose Tree
 On a Political Prisoner
 The Leaders of the Crowd
 Towards Break of Day
 Demon and Beast
 The Second Coming
 A Prayer for My Daughter
 A Meditation in Time of War
 To be Carved on a Stone at Thoor Ballylee

See also
 1920 in poetry
 1920 in literature
 Thoor Ballylee

External links

Michael Robartes and the Dancer on theotherpages.org

1920 poetry books
Irish poetry collections
Poetry by W. B. Yeats